Marius Stravinsky (born 1979) is a Kazakh-British conductor and violinist.

Studies 

Marius Stravinsky was born in Almaty, Kazakhstan. He began his violin studies at the age of four at the Moscow Central Music School, and later moved to London, where he continued at the Yehudi Menuhin School and then Eton College. He graduated from the Royal Academy of Music in London in 2002. As a violinist, Marius Stravinsky has performed extensively, including Lockenhaus Chamber Music Festival, Spoleto Music Festival, Melbourne International Arts Festival and many others. In 1998, he was invited to the Aix-en-Provence Festival as Claudio Abbado's assistant conductor in Peter Brook's new "Don Giovanni" production. Another one of his regular conducting mentors was Igor Golovchin, and Marius has also taken part in masterclasses with Kenneth Kiesler and Eri Klas. From 2002-2005, Stravinsky returned to Moscow to study conducting at the Moscow Conservatory with Vladimir Ponkin, working as his Assistant Conductor in both the Moscow Philharmonic Orchestra and the Helikon Opera.

Professional 
Whilst resident at Helikon Opera, his performances included fully staged productions of Berg ("Lulu"), Bizet ("Carmen"), Giorgdano ("Siberia"), Poulenc ("Les Dialogue des Carmelites"), Prokofiev ("The Story of a Real Man"), Rimsky-Korsakov ("Kaschei the Immortal"), Shostakovich ("Lady Macbeth of the Mtensk District"), and works by Igor Stravinsky (such as "Mavra"). In 2007, Stravinsky was awarded the position of Chief Conductor & Artistic Director of the Karelia Philharmonic Orchestra, and following his five-year tenure in this role, he then – at the personal invitation of Vladimir Jurowski –  took up the position of Assistant Conductor of the London Philharmonic Orchestra for the 2013/2014 season.

Stravinsky's discography includes recordings of Ignaz Brüll’s Violin Concerto and Symphony in E minor, Salomon Jadassohn’s Symphony No.1, and Pavel Pabst’s Piano Concerto, on the Cameo Classics Label.  During his tenure as Chief Conductor & Artistic Director, Stravinsky also released recordings of major works by Maurice Blower, Dorothy Howell, Joseph Holbrooke and Sergey Zhukov with the Karelia Philharmonic Orchestra.

Personal life
Marius Stravinsky is related to Igor Stravinsky, Russian composer.

References

External links

British male conductors (music)
Living people
People educated at Eton College
Alumni of the Royal Academy of Music
People educated at Yehudi Menuhin School
1979 births
21st-century British conductors (music)
21st-century British male musicians
People from Almaty